The Beau Brummels is a 1928 Vitaphone short film (Release 2686) featuring vaudeville duo Al Shaw (Albert Schutzman, 1902-1985) and Sam Lee (Sam Levy, 1891-1980). It was the first film the team made together. The film was selected to the United States National Film Registry in 2016 as "culturally, historically or aesthetically” significant.

Plot

The Beau Brummels, performed in a deadpan manner, opens with curtains parting to reveal Shaw and Lee standing next to each other wearing matching suits, bow ties, and hats. They begin by performing a parody of the song "Strolling Through the Park One Day,"  in which they describe a woman with crossed eyes, knock-knees, flat feet, and a wig that's turning gray, before briefly singing in Yiddish. Then they slowly remove their hats, sing a song a capella, "Don't Forget to Breathe of Else You'll Die"  giving advice ("Always eat when you are hungry, always drink when you are dry, go to bed when you are sleepy, but don't forget to breathe or else you'll die."), and slowly replace their hats.

The duo then continues by telling a series of jokes, such as:

 "20 people under one umbrella and not one got wet." "How's that?" "It wasn't raining."
 "I wasn't born, I'm a self-made man." "Well, come around when you're finished."

In between jokes, the two occasionally begin speaking at the same time and turn to each other and say, "Huh?"

The film ends with the duo singing a self-referential song ("This Is the Chorus") before breaking into a brief dance routine performed without background music.

Throughout the film, Shaw & Lee sing and tell jokes in a monotone manner while standing still and facing the camera. Aside from the brief dance number at the end, taking off and replacing their hats, and bowing to the audience in the film's final moments, they only move to give each other confused looks.

Availability
The Vitaphone Project helped develop funding for a restoration of The Beau Brummels by the UCLA Film and Television Archive in the early 2000s.

The Beau Brummels was included along with other Vitaphone shorts as part of the 80th anniversary DVD and the 2013 blu-ray releases of The Jazz Singer. A restored print of The Beau Brummels was screened at the Turner Classic Movies Classic Film Festival in 2016.

References

External links

The Beau Brummels on Vimeo
Shaw & Lee: Vaudeville's Loony Futurists

United States National Film Registry films
1928 films
1928 short films
American short films
1928 comedy films